Mudras Calling is a Burmese Drama and romance film with Burmese Subtitle.  The film was written and directed by Christina Kyi . In this film, starred Myanmar movie stars, Zenn Kyi, Hla Yin Kyae, Nann Wai Wai Htun & more. The movie is produced by Central Base production.

The movie was officially released on March 3, 2018 at cinemas around Myanmar. And, It was screened at thirteen international film festivals in thirteen different countries. It got 2 international movie awards.

Cast

Zenn Kyi as Jadan William
Hla Yin Kyae as Hnin Thuzar
Nann Wai Wai Htun as Nu Nu

References

2018 films
Burmese romantic drama films